The Uruguayan Clásico (Spanish: Clásico del fútbol uruguayo) is the most important rivalry in Uruguayan football and one of the best on the American continent. It is contested between the two most popular football clubs in Uruguay, Club Nacional de Football and Club Atlético Peñarol (formerly known as CURCC), both based in Montevideo. As of 2018, the two teams have won 96 of the 115 Uruguayan Primera División titles, and many international tournaments, including a combined eight Copa Libertadores. The first meeting between the two teams was at the turn of the century in 1900, making it one of the oldest football rivalries outside Great Britain. CURCC won the first match 2–0.

Founded as the Central Uruguay Railway Cricket Club (CURCC) in 1891, it was originally made up of English immigrants representing the Central Uruguay Railway (Ferrocarril Central del Uruguay), and was based in the Peñarol district in the outskirts of the city. Nacional was formed in 1899 as a club for purely native players at a time when football clubs were almost exclusively the domain of European immigrants. CURCC won the first match 2–0.

Match history

Nacional v CURCC

Nacional v Peñarol

Nacional v Peñarol/CURCC 

Source: RSSSF, updated as of 21 January 2019.

Title comparison

Notes

References

Association football rivalries
Football in Uruguay
1900 establishments in Uruguay
Club Nacional de Football